The 1844 United States presidential election in New York took place between November 1 and December 4, 1844, as part of the 1844 United States presidential election. Voters chose 36 representatives, or electors to the Electoral College, who voted for President and Vice President.

New York voted for the Democratic candidate, James K. Polk, over Whig candidate Henry Clay. Polk won New York by a margin of 1.05%. New York was decisive; if Clay had won the state, he would have received 141 electoral votes, more than the 138 needed to win at the time.

Results

See also
 United States presidential elections in New York

References

New York
1844
1844 New York (state) elections